Kaifi Azmi (born Athar Husain Rizvi; 14 January 1919 – 10 May 2002) was an Indian Urdu poet. He is remembered as the one who brought Urdu literature to Indian motion pictures. Together with Pirzada Qasim, Jaun Elia and others he participated in many memorable Mushaira gatherings of the twentieth century. His wife was theatre and film actress Shaukat Kaifi.

Early life
Azmi was born into a Shia Muslim family in the village of Mizwaan in Azamgarh district of Uttar Pradesh.

Family
He was from a family of artists. His three brothers are also shayars (poets). Azmi was married to Shaukat Azmi. They have a daughter, Shabana Azmi who is an actress, and a son, Baba Azmi, a cinematographer. Azmi's daughter-in-law Tanvi Azmi is also an actress.

Career

Writings
At age eleven, Azmi wrote his first ghazal in Bahraich Itna To Zindagi Mein Kisi Ki Khalal Pade and somehow managed to get himself invited to a mushaira and over there, he recited a ghazal, rather a couplet of the ghazal which was very much appreciated by the president of the mushaira, Mani Jaisi, but most of the people, including his father, thought he recited his elder brother's ghazal. When his elder brother denied it, his father and his clerk decided to test his poetic talent. They gave him one of the lines of a couplet and asked him to write a ghazal in the same meter and rhyme. Azmi accepted the challenge and completed a ghazal. This particular ghazal was to become a rage in undivided India and it was immortalised as it was sung by legendary ghazal singer, Begum Akhtar. Azmi abandoned his studies of Persian and Urdu during the Quit India agitations in 1942 and shortly thereafter became a full-time Marxist when he accepted membership of the Communist Party of India in 1943. During this period, the leading progressive writers of Lucknow noticed him. They were very impressed by his leadership qualities. They also saw in him a budding poet and extended all possible encouragement towards him. Consequently, Azmi started to win great acclaim as a poet and became a member of Progressive Writers' Movement of India. At the age of twenty-four, he started activities in the textile mill areas of Kanpur. As a full-time worker, he left his life of comfort, though he was the son of a zamindar. He was asked to shift his base to Bombay, work amongst the workers and start party work with a lot of zeal and enthusiasm.

Poetry

Like most of the Urdu poets, Azmi began as a ghazal writer, cramming his poetry with the repeated themes of love and romance in a style that was replete with clichés and metaphors. However, his association with the Progressive Writers' Movement and Communist Party made him embark on the path of socially conscious poetry. In his poetry, he highlights the exploitation of the subaltern masses and through them he conveys a message of the creation of a just social order by dismantling the existing one. Yet, his poetry cannot be called plain propaganda. It has its own merits; intensity of emotions, in particular, and the spirit of sympathy and compassion towards the disadvantaged section of society, are the hallmark of his poetry. His poems are also notable for their rich imagery and in this respect, his contribution to Urdu poetry can hardly be overstated. Azmi's first collection of poems, Jhankar was published in 1943. His important works including anthologies of poetry, were Aakhir-e-Shab, Sarmaya, Awaara Sajde, Kaifiyaat, Nai Gulistan, an anthology of articles he wrote for Urdu Blitz, Meri Awaaz Suno, a selection of his film lyrics, and the script of Heer Ranjha in Devanagari.

His best known poems are Aurat, Makaan, Daaera, Sanp, and Bahuroopni.

Films
Azmi's work in films includes working as a lyricist, writer, and actor. Azmi wrote his first lyrics for the film Buzdil, directed by Shaheed Latif and music by SD Burman, released in 1951. His early work as a writer was mainly for Nanubhai Vakil's films like Yahudi Ki Beti (1956), Parvin (1957), Miss Punjab Mail (1958) and Id Ka Chand (1964). While directors like Khwaja Ahmad Abbas and Bimal Roy strove to create the "New Cinema", writers like Sahir Ludhianvi, Jan Nisar Akhtar, Majrooh Sultanpuri, and Kaifi changed the tenor and vocabulary of the Hindi film song, creating a fresh new wave in Hindi film lyrics that lasted many years. His greatest feat as a writer was Chetan Anand's Heer Raanjha (1970) wherein the entire dialogue of the film was in verse. It was a tremendous achievement and one of the greatest feats of Hindi film writing. Azmi also won great critical accolades for the script, dialogues and lyrics of M.S. Sathyu's Garam Hawa (1973), based on a story by Ismat Chughtai. Azmi also wrote the dialogues for Shyam Benegal's Manthan (1976) and Sathyu's Kanneshwara Rama (1977). As a lyricist and songwriter, though he wrote for numerous films, he will always be remembered for Guru Dutt's Kaagaz Ke Phool (1959) and Chetan Anand's Haqeeqat (1964), India's greatest war film. Some notables films for which he wrote lyrics include Kohra (1964), Anupama (1966), Uski Kahani (1966), Saat Hindustani (1969), Shola Aur Shabnam, Parwana (1971), Bawarchi (1972), Pakeezah (1972), Hanste Zakhm (1973), Arth (1982) and Razia Sultan (1983). For Naunihal (1967), he wrote the song "Meri Aawaz Suno Pyar ka Raaz Suno" (Hear my voice, hear the secret of love) sung by Mohammad Rafi. The song is picturised over the funeral procession of Prime Minister of India, Jawahar Lal Nehru. Years later, after Azmi's own death his daughter, Shabana Azmi mentioned finding comfort in verses from the song. Azmi wrote the lyrics for Bible Ki Kahaniyan, the first Christian mythological television show broadcast in India. He also played a memorable role of Naseem's grandfather in Naseem (1995). Azmi died on 10 May 2002 at around the age of eighty-three. He was survived by his wife, daughter, and son. His autobiography is included in a collection of his works, Aaj Ke Prashid Shayar: Kaifi Azmi.

In media
Azmi was the subject of a documentary film called Diksha (2015), directed by Raman Kumar. In 1997, he recited his own poems for Kaifiyaat, an audio book on his collected works.

Kaifi Aur Mein, a play based on his life, his works and the memoir of his wife, Shaukat Azmi – Yadon Ki Rahguzar (Down Memory Lane), was written and performed by Javed Akhtar and Shabana Azmi, and performed in India as well as abroad in 2006. Another play, directed by Rani Balbir, Waqt Ne Kiya Kya Hasin Sitam, based on Kaifi Azmi's life and writings was staged in 2005, and received rave reviews.

Awards
He was the recipient of Padma Shri, India's fourth-highest civilian award in 1974. Besides he was awarded the Uttar Pradesh Urdu Academy Award and the Sahitya Akademi Award for Urdu for his collection Awaara Sajde, Special Award of Maharashtra Urdu Academy, Soviet Land Nehru Award, Lotus Award from the Afro-Asian Writers' Association, and President's Award for national integration. In 1998, Government of Maharashtra conferred the Jyaneshwara Award on him. He was also honoured with the prestigious Sahitya Akademi Fellowship for lifetime achievement.

Kaifi Azmi returned his Padma Shri in the 1980s after the then Chief Minister of Uttar Pradesh Vir Bahadur Singh remarked that those speaking Urdu as a second language should be made to sit on a donkey and paraded. According to his daughter Shabana Azmi, her father replied that he had written in Urdu all his life, and if his State’s Chief Minister held such views on the language, he, as a writer, must stand up for himself. 

In 2000, he was conferred the first Millennium Award by the Government of Delhi and the Delhi Urdu Academy. He has also been honoured with a doctorate from Vishva Bharati University, Santiniketan.

Tribute

The government has also inaugurated a train named "Kaifiyat Express" which runs from his hometown Azamgarh to Old Delhi.

On 14 January 2020, search engine Google commemorated Kaifi Azmi with a Doodle on his 101st birth anniversary. Google commented: "With work ranging from passionate love poems and activist verses to Bollywood songs lyrics and screenplays, Azmi has become one of the most renowned poets of the 20th century in India, and his humanitarian efforts continue to impact people's lives today." There is street also named after him Kaifi Azmi road in Hyderabad. There is also a road in R. K. Puram, New Delhi named Kaifi Azmi Marg after him.

Sahitya Akademi Award
 1975: Sahitya Akademi Award: Awara Sajde 
 2002: Sahitya Akademi Fellowship (Immortals of Literature)

National Film Awards
 1970: National Film Award for Best Lyrics: Saat Hindustani
 1973: National Film Award for Best Story: Garam Hawa (with Ismat Chughtai)

Filmfare Awards
 1975: Filmfare Award for Best Dialogue: Garam Hawa
 1975: Filmfare Award for Best Story: Garam Hawa (with Ismat Chughtai)
 1975: Filmfare Award for Best Screenplay: Garam Hawa

Select bibliography
 Kaifi Azmi – Fan Aur Shaqsiyat (Urdu), Mayar Publications, 2004.
 Kaifiyaat: Kulliyat-e-Kaifi Azmi (Urdu), Educational Publishing House, 2003. .
 Zehr-e-Ishq (Hindi), Vani Prakashan, 2003.
 Heer Ranjha (Hindi), Vani Prakshan, 2003.
 Steel Man was Here, Penguin, 2002.
 Kaifi Azmi – Selected Poems and Life Sketch, Rajpal Publishers, 2002. .
 Aaj Ke Prashid Shayar: Kaifi Azmi – Chuni Hui Shayari (Hindi), Rajpal & Sons, 2002. .
 Meri Awaz Suno (Hindi), Rajkamal Prakashan, 2002.
 Nai Gulistan Vol. 1 (Hindi), Rajkamal Prakashan, 2001.
 Nai Gulistan Vol. 2 (Hindi), Rajkamal Prakashan, 2001.
 Doosra Banwas (Hindi), Diamond Pocket Books Pvt. Ltd. .
 Awara Sajde (Hindi), Lokbharti Prakashan, 1995.
 Sarmaya (Urdu), Mayar Publications, 1994.
 Kaifi Azmi: Symbol of Resistance – Ranjit Hoskote. The Hindu, 19 May 2002.
 Kaifi Azmi: A Poet and a Gentleman. The Times of India, 10 May 2002.
 Kaifi Azmi: The Last Comrade-poet – Tarique Omum. The Milli Gazette. 1 June 2002.

References

External links
 
 
 Recordings of Kaifi Azmi at Library of Congress
 kaifiaurmain.com - kaifiaurmain Resources and Information. Kaifi Aur Main, a tribute site by IPTA.
 A collection of verses and mushaira recordings by Kaifi Azmi
 Poetry of Kaifi
Film on Kaifi Azmi by NCERT

1919 births
2002 deaths
 Recipients of the Padma Shri in literature & education
 Recipients of the Sahitya Akademi Award in Urdu
 Recipients of the Sahitya Akademi Fellowship
 Filmfare Awards winners
Urdu-language poets from India
 Indian male poets
 Indian lyricists
 Indian Shia Muslims
 Indian Marxist poets
 Indian Communist poets
 People from Azamgarh district
 Writers from Lucknow
 Aligarh Muslim University alumni
 Poets from Uttar Pradesh
20th-century Indian poets
 Best Lyrics National Film Award winners
 Best Story National Film Award winners
Communist Party of India politicians from Uttar Pradesh